Volubilis is a French-Moroccan film directed by Faouzi Bensaïdi, released in 2017. It was screened at a number of international film festivals.

Cast 

 Nadia Kounda
 Mouhcine Malzi
 Abdelhadi Talbi
 Nezha Rahil
 Faouzi Bensaïdi

Awards and accolades 
Volubilis was presented at the Giornate degli Autor/Venice Days section at the 2017 Venice Film Festival. It won the Tanit de bronze at the 2017 Carthage Film Festival. Nadia Kounda won Best Actress at the El Gouna Film Festival for her performance in the film. It was also screened at the 2017 Festival du Nouveau Cinéma in Montréal.

References 

Moroccan drama films
2017 films